This is a list of yearly Oregon Collegiate Conference football standings.

Oregon Collegiate Conference football standings

References

Oregon Collegiate Conference
Standings